Reiley McClendon (born Eric Reiley McClendon II; March 11, 1990) is an American actor.

He has appeared on such television shows as Will & Grace, Zoey 101, and Medium, as well as in Disney Channel films such as Eddie's Million Dollar Cook-Off and Buffalo Dreams.

He played the young Danny Walker in the 2001 film Pearl Harbor with Jesse James, who played Rafe McCawley. He appeared in the Law & Order: Special Victims Unit episode "Identity" in a dual role as identical twins Logan and Lindsay Stanton. He had a role in Shangri-La Suite (2016) opposite Luke Grimes and Emily Browning.

Filmography

References

External links

1990 births
American male child actors
American male film actors
American male television actors
Living people
Male actors from Baton Rouge, Louisiana
Episcopal High School (Baton Rouge, Louisiana) alumni